"Where Are You Now?" is a song by Australian band Roxus. The song was released in April 1991 as the lead single from their debut studio album Nightstreet (1991). The song was the band's highest-charting single, peaking at number 13 on the Australian ARIA Chart and was certified gold.

Track listing
 Vinyl / 7" single (K10250)
 "Where Are You Now?" - 4:12	
 "Borderline" - 3:40

Chart performance

Weekly charts

Year-end charts

Certification

References

External links
 "Where Are You Now?" by Roxus

1991 singles
1991 songs
Roxus songs
Song recordings produced by Mark Opitz